The 1975 Norwegian Football Cup was the 70th edition of the Norwegian annual knockout football tournament. The Cup was won by Bodø/Glimt after beating Vard in the cup final with the score 2–0. This was Bodø/Glimt's first Norwegian Cup title.

First round

|-
|colspan="3" style="background-color:#97DEFF"|Replay

|}

Second round

|-
|colspan="3" style="background-color:#97DEFF"|Replay

|}

Third round

|colspan="3" style="background-color:#97DEFF"|25 June 1975

|-
|colspan="3" style="background-color:#97DEFF"|26 June 1975

|-
|colspan="3" style="background-color:#97DEFF"|1 July 1975

|-
|colspan="3" style="background-color:#97DEFF"|2 July 1975

|-
|colspan="3" style="background-color:#97DEFF"|3 July 1975

|-
|colspan="3" style="background-color:#97DEFF"|Replay: 2 July 1975

|-
|colspan="3" style="background-color:#97DEFF"|Replay: 11 July 1975

|}

Fourth round

|colspan="3" style="background-color:#97DEFF"|17 August 1975

|-
|colspan="3" style="background-color:#97DEFF"|Replay: 21 August 1975

|}

Quarter-finals

|colspan="3" style="background-color:#97DEFF"|7 September 1975

|}

Semi-finals

|colspan="3" style="background-color:#97DEFF"|8 October 1975

|}

Final

This was the first time a team from Northern Norway played in (and won) a cup final. Both teams played in the second division at the time.

References 
http://www.rsssf.no

Norwegian Football Cup seasons
Norway
Football Cup